Tamanend was honored as the figurehead of  in a carving by William Luke. Tamanend the “affable” (c. 1628–1698) was a chief of one of the clans that made up the Lenni-Lenape nation in the Delaware Valley. He is best known as a lover of peace and friendship who played a prominent role in the establishment of peaceful relations among the Native American tribes and the English settlers who established Pennsylvania, led by William Penn. 

The USS Delaware was burned in 1861 at the Gosport Navy Yard to prevent Confederate capture at the start of the Civil War. In 1866, the salvaged figurehead was transferred to the United States Naval Academy and placed on a pedestal facing Bancroft Hall, the Naval Academy's dormitory that is said to be the largest dormitory in the United States, and is flanked by Stribling Walk on both sides.

For 40 years, the wooden figurehead kept its vigil in the Yard until the weather began to take its toll. In 1906 repairs using cement, putty, and paint temporarily removed the signs of age. When the ravages of the elements again threatened, the Class of 1891 had the statue cast in bronze and presented it to the Brigade of Midshipmen and Naval Academy. The task of restoration was accomplished at the U.S. Naval Gun Factory.

Description
The statue is positioned on a base of Vermont marble and measures . The area between the figurehead and Bancroft Hall is called T-Court. In 1930, the wooden "heart" and "brains" of the original statue were transferred to the bronze statue.

Inscriptions
On the front base of the statue:

On the statue's bronze base, to the rear:

Traditions

Tamanend is sometimes referred to as the "God of 2.0," the passing grade point average at the Academy. Midshipmen toss pennies at the quiver on Tamanend's back for good luck during their exam periods and Army-Navy competitions.

9th company is responsible for spirit boards to be painted and displayed around Tamanend's base before major events and home games (e.g. for Parents' Weekend in August, Homecoming in the fall, before Army-Navy contests, and for Commissioning Week in May).

References

Monuments and memorials in Maryland
Bronze sculptures in the United States
1817 sculptures
1930 sculptures
Sculptures of Native Americans